The Cambridgeshire derby is a sobriquet used to describe football matches held between Cambridge United and Peterborough United, the only fully professional football clubs in Cambridgeshire.

The first derby took place on 22 March 1956 and has since been played 48 times with Peterborough winning 20 to Cambridge United's 15. The most recent derby took place in the EFL League One  On The 29th Of October 2022, a match which Peterborough won 1-0 at their home ground, London Road. It has been 2 years since the last time Cambridge United won the derby on 10th November 2020 with One match having been played over the period.

The Cambridgeshire derby is one of 23 requited rivalries in English football.

History 
The first league meeting between Peterborough United and Cambridge United took place in Division Four in October 1970 at Abbey Stadium. The match ended in a 1–1 draw, however Cambridge United won the first league derby with a 3–2 away win at London Road later the same season.

Following Cambridge's relegation after the 2001-02 Second Division, the sides would not face each other in a competitive fixture for nearly 16 years.

In August 2015, a memorial match was played between the two teams in honour of Chris Turner who had died four months earlier. Turner, who was born in Cambridgeshire, made 314 league appearances for Peterborough and 90 for Cambridge United before going on to manage both clubs. In September 2017, a statue of Turner was unveiled outside London Road.

The drought of competitive derbies ended with an EFL Trophy match played in Cambridge on 7 November 2017. Before the game, a smoke grenade was set off in a pub near Abbey Stadium. The pub was evacuated but reopened 85 minutes later with no injuries reported. Cambridge's 2020 victory on penalties in the EFL Trophy group stage was their first over Peterborough in any competition since 1998, in what was the Football League Third Division.

Since Peterborough's relegation following the 2021–22 season, both clubs now compete in EFL League One. The next derby will take place on 15 April 2023.

All-time results

League

Cup

Statistics 
Statistics correct as of match played on 12 November 2019.

Notes

References

England football derbies
Football in Cambridgeshire
Cambridge United F.C.
Peterborough United F.C.
1956 establishments in England